Disseminate and recurrent infundibulofolliculitis, also called disseminate and recurrent infundibular folliculitis or Hitch and Lund disease, is a rare follicular skin condition that presents with irregularly shaped papules pierced by hair, is mildly itchy at times, and is chronic with recurrent exacerbations.

See also
Skin lesion

References

Conditions of the skin appendages